Loubieh, or  Lubia (Arabic: لوبية) is a town in south Lebanon 62 km from  and 20 km south of Saida, 21 km north of Tyre, area 2.23 km², altitude 144 m.

Lubia is also the name for a traditional Lebanese mezze made from green beans, tomatoes, onions, garlic and salt, all sauteed in olive oil.

External links
Loubieh, Localiban 

Populated places in Sidon District